Andrea Dennise Aldana Bennett is a Guatemalan sports sailor. At the 2012 Summer Olympics, she competed in the Women's Laser Radial class, finishing in 32nd place.

References

1989 births
Living people
Guatemalan female sailors (sport)
Olympic sailors of Guatemala
Sailors at the 2012 Summer Olympics – Laser Radial
Pan American Games competitors for Guatemala
Sailors at the 2015 Pan American Games
Central American and Caribbean Games bronze medalists for Guatemala
Central American and Caribbean Games medalists in sailing
Competitors at the 2010 Central American and Caribbean Games